Crassodontidanidae is a family of extinct cow sharks that lived from the Early Jurassic to the Early Cretaceous. It contains three genera: Crassodontidanus, Notidanoides, and Pachyhexanchus.

References

Jurassic sharks
Cretaceous sharks
Shark families
Prehistoric cartilaginous fish families
Sinemurian first appearances
Hexanchiformes